The Men's ski slopestyle competition at the FIS Freestyle Ski and Snowboarding World Championships 2023 was held on 26 and 28 February 2023.

Qualification
The qualification was started on 26 February at 14:00. The eight best skiers from each heat qualified for the final.

Heat 1

Heat 2

Final
The final was started on 28 February at 13:30.

References

Men's ski slopestyle